Zadorov is a Russian masculine surname, its feminine counterpart is Zadorova. It may refer to
Nikita Zadorov (born 1995), Russian ice hockey defenseman 
Roman Zadorov, Ukrainian citizen, who is serving a life sentence in Israel 

Russian-language surnames